"Locked Away" is a song by Virgin Islands production duo R. City featuring American singer Adam Levine, the lead singer of pop rock band Maroon 5. The song was released on June 29, 2015, by Kemosabe Records and RCA Records. The song peaked at number six on the Billboard Hot 100, making it the duo's first top ten hit and Levine's first single that he did not co-write.

Composition 
Musically, "Locked Away" is a dancehall and reggae fusion song. According to the sheet music published at Musicnotes.com by Universal Music Publishing, the song is written in the key of D major with a tempo of 94 beats per minute.  The chorus follows a chord progression of D–Bm–G–D–A, the verses follow a chord progression of B–Gm–D–Fm, the bridge follow the progression Gbmaj7-D-Bm-A and the vocals span from B2 to A4. The melody in the chorus contains an interpolation of Do That To Me One More Time by American duo Captain & Tennille.

Meaning 
The meaning of the song "Locked Away" seems to ask if you would truly love someone for your whole life despite all the flaws which may arise. As Theron—one of the song authors—explain: “Locked Away” is based on our parents. Our dad went to jail for five years, came out and became a trash man. Then he worked at the legislature as a security guard. He didn’t make real money, he was on drugs, did all kinds of crazy shit. But our mom held him down. Our parents been together for 38 years—they’re still together.

With the success of being a songwriter, where you can get fly and have all this nice shit, we’re like, “You really like me? If I was fucked up, would you hold me down?"

Remix
The official remix is titled "Locked Away Again (The Remix)" and features an additional verse from American rapper Lil Wayne. It cancels the bridge by R. City and replaces their first verse of the original song to the third verse. The second verse is the same as in the original song.

Music video
A music video for "Locked Away" was released on August 14, 2015.

The music video features four different families, a soldier leaving his family to return to service, a man (Theron Thomas of R. City) and a woman (Chantel K Davis) fighting to make ends meet, a man (Timothy Thomas of R. City) returning home to his child and the child's mother, and a father and daughter torn apart by an unlawful act. All suffering from vignettes of love, loss, poverty, and imprisonment, all set over Levine's crooned chorus "If I got locked away / and we lost it all today / tell me honestly / would you still love me the same?"

Charts

Weekly charts

Year-end charts

Certifications

References

External links
 

2014 songs
2015 singles
Adam Levine songs
Rock City (duo) songs
Dancehall songs
Number-one singles in Poland
Songs written by Cirkut (record producer)
Songs written by Theron Thomas
Songs written by Timothy Thomas
Songs written by Dr. Luke
Song recordings produced by Dr. Luke
Song recordings produced by Cirkut (record producer)
Kemosabe Records singles
Torch songs